The women's Shot Put at the 2014 IAAF World Indoor Championships took place on 8 March 2014.

Medalists

Records

Qualification standards

Schedule

Results

Qualification
Qualification: 18.70 (Q) or at least 8 best performers (q) qualified for the final.

Final

References

Shot Put
Shot put at the World Athletics Indoor Championships
2014 in women's athletics